Mathias Lerch (Matyáš Lerch) (20 February 1860, Milínov – 3 August 1922, Sušice) was a Czech mathematician who published about 250 papers, largely on mathematical analysis and number theory. He studied in Prague and Berlin, and held teaching positions at the Czech Technical Institute in Prague, the University of Fribourg in Switzerland, the Czech Technical Institute in Brno, and Masaryk University in Brno; he was the first mathematics professor at Masaryk University when it was founded in 1920. 

In 1900, he was awarded the Grand Prize of the French Academy of Sciences for his number-theoretic work. The Lerch zeta function is named after him, as is the Appell–Lerch sum. His doctoral students include Michel Plancherel and Otakar Borůvka.

References

External links
 

1860 births
1922 deaths
Czech mathematicians
Academic staff of Masaryk University
Academic staff of the University of Fribourg